The 2019–20 Regionalliga was the twelfth season of the Regionalliga, the eighth under the new format, as the fourth tier of the German football league system.

Format
The same promotion format as in the previous season was used. According to the draw that took place on 27 April 2018, the Regionalliga Nord, Südwest, and Bayern champions were directly promoted to the 2020–21 3. Liga, while the champions of the Regionalliga Nordost and West played promotion play-offs to determine the fourth team to be promoted.

Effects of the COVID-19 pandemic
Due to the COVID-19 pandemic in Germany, all scheduled match days in the five Regionalligas were initially suspended in March 2020. The Bavarian Football Association (BVF) announced its decision to suspend all scheduled match days indefinitely on 4 March 2020. 

The Regionalliga Südwest was cancelled on 26 May 2020. 1. FC Saarbrücken were declared champions and were promoted to the 3. Liga, while no teams were relegated and four teams were promoted from the Oberliga, leading to an expansion of the league for the upcoming season.

The Regionalliga Nordost was also cancelled on 5 June 2020. Lokomotive Leipzig were declared champions and qualified for the promotion play-offs, while no teams were relegated based on sporting criteria and two teams were promoted from the NOFV-Oberliga, leading to an expansion of the league for the upcoming season. Rot-Weiß Erfurt had been placed into administration on 29 January 2020 and was therefore relegated to the NOFV-Oberliga. On 25 June 2020, Wacker Nordhausen was voluntarily relegated to the Oberliga after filing for insolvency in December.

The Regionalliga Bayern clubs voted on 4 June 2020 to extend their league season beyond September, which meant the Bavarian Football Association had to cancel the 2020–21 season and continue without Türkgücü München, which the BFA registered for promotion to the 3. Liga. Thus, Bavaria is to be represented by a team that wins a play-off series, to be held in the spring of 2021, among the top four teams at the end of the resumed Regionalliga Bayern season. They would have already submitted applications for 3. Liga licences. The Bavarian play-off winners are to face the Regionalliga Nord champions for a place in the 2021–22 3. Liga.

The Regionalliga West was curtailed on 20 June 2020. SV Rödinghausen were declared champions. Since they did not apply for a 3. Liga licence, second-placed SC Verl qualified for the promotion play-offs, while no teams were relegated based on sporting criteria and three teams were promoted from the Oberliga, leading to an expansion of the league for the upcoming season. SG Wattenscheid had been placed into administration on 23 October 2019 and was therefore relegated to the Oberliga.

The Regionalliga Nord was terminated on 25 June 2020. VfB Lübeck were declared champions and were promoted to the 3. Liga, while no teams were relegated and five teams were promoted from the Oberliga, leading to an expansion of the league for the upcoming season.

Regionalliga Nord
18 teams from the states of Bremen, Hamburg, Lower Saxony and Schleswig-Holstein competed in the eighth season of the reformed Regionalliga Nord. Hannoverscher SC was promoted from the 2018–19 Niedersachsenliga, Altona 93 was promoted from the 2018–19 Oberliga Hamburg and Heider SV was promoted from the 2018–19 Schleswig-Holstein-Liga.

After the season's cancellation, the final standings were based on an average of points earned per matches played.

Regionalliga Nordost
18 teams from the states of Berlin, Brandenburg, Mecklenburg-Vorpommern, Saxony, Saxony-Anhalt and Thuringia competed in the eighth season of the reformed Regionalliga Nordost. FC Energie Cottbus was relegated from the 2018–19 3. Liga. SV Lichtenberg 47 was promoted from the 2018–19 NOFV-Oberliga Nord and BSG Chemie Leipzig was promoted from the 2018–19 NOFV-Oberliga Süd.

After the season's cancellation, the final standings were based on an average of points earned per matches played.

Regionalliga West
19 teams from North Rhine-Westphalia competed in the Regionalliga West. Sportfreunde Lotte and Fortuna Köln were relegated from the 2018–19 3. Liga. SV Bergisch Gladbach was promoted from the 2018–19 Mittelrheinliga, VfB Homberg was promoted from the 2018–19 Oberliga Niederrhein and Schalke 04 II and TuS Haltern were promoted from the 2018–19 Oberliga Westfalen.

After the season cancellation, the final standings were based on an average of points earned per matches played.

Westphalian DFB-Pokal play-off
As the Westphalian Football and Athletics Association is one of three regional associations with the most participating teams in their league competitions, they are allowed to enter a second team for the 2020–21 DFB-Pokal (in addition to the Westphalian Cup winners). A play-off is to take place between the best-placed eligible (non-reserve) Westphalian team of the Regionalliga West and the best-placed eligible team of the Oberliga Westfalen, with the winners qualifying for the DFB-Pokal.

Regionalliga Südwest
18 teams from Baden-Württemberg, Hesse, Rhineland-Palatinate and Saarland competed in the eighth season of the Regionalliga Südwest. VfR Aalen was relegated from the 2018–19 3. Liga. Rot-Weiß Koblenz was promoted from the 2018–19 Oberliga Rheinland-Pfalz/Saar, Bahlinger SC was promoted from the 2018–19 Oberliga Baden-Württemberg and FC Gießen and Bayern Alzenau were promoted from the 2018–19 Hessenliga.

After the season cancellation, the final standings were based on an average of points earned per matches played.

Regionalliga Bayern

18 teams from Bavaria competed in the eighth season of the Regionalliga Bayern. Türkgücü München and TSV Rain am Lech were promoted from the 2018–19 Bayernliga Süd and TSV Aubstadt was promoted from the 2018–19 Bayernliga Nord.

After the Bavarian association cancelled the 2020–21 season, which would have been the ninth for the Regionalliga Bayern, and enrolled Türkgücü München in the 3. Liga, the ongoing season had to resume without Türkgücü in September 2020 and conclude in mid-2021.

Promotion play-offs
The dates and the draw were announced on 12 June 2020. Due to the COVID-19 pandemic in Germany, the matches were played behind closed doors.

|}

All times Central European Summer Time (UTC+2)

3–3 on aggregate. SC Verl won on away goals.

Notes

References

External links
 Regionalliga   DFB.de
 Regionalliga Nord  nordfv.de
 Regionalliga West  wdfv.de
 Regionalliga Bayern  bfv.de

2019-20
4
2019–20 in European fourth tier association football leagues
Association football events postponed due to the COVID-19 pandemic
Germany